This is a list of disability organizations, including advocacy groups and charities that provide services to people with disabilities.

Organizations

A

Action Deaf Youth
ADAPT
American Association on Intellectual and Developmental Disabilities (AAIDD) (1876) – AAIDD are promoters for people with intellectual and developmental disabilities.
American Association of People with Disabilities (AAPD) (1995) – a cross-disability organization that focuses on advocacy and services.
American Coalition of Citizens with Disabilities (ACCD) (1975) – coalition of local, state and national disability organizations.
American Council of the Blind (ACB) – represents a diverse range of groups within the blind community.
American Diabetes Association (ADA) (1939) – educates the public about diabetes.
American Foundation for the Blind (1921) – primarily serves the blind population and focuses on advocacy and services.
The Arc of the United States – A national organization serving people with intellectual and developmental disabilities.
ARC Association for Real Change (1976) – supports the providers of the individuals with learning disabilities.
Aspies For Freedom (AFF) – Raises public awareness for autism.
Autism Network International (ANI) (1992) – Advocacy and self-help for autistic people.
Autistic Self Advocacy Network (ASAN) (2006) – Advocacy to empower autistic people worldwide.

B
Burton Blatt Institute (BBI) – Advance the civic, economic, and social participation of persons with disabilities in a global society.
Best Buddies International (BBI) – create opportunities for people with intellectual and developmental disabilities to make friends.
British Columbia Aboriginal Network on Disability Society (BCANDS) - Canadian Indigenous cross disability organization

C
Canadian National Institute for the Blind (CNIB) (1918) – Volunteer organization dedicated to assisting Canadians who are blind.
Catalan Association for the Blind and Visually Impaired (1993) – Helps support blind and visually impaired in everyday life.
Center for Independent Living (1972)
Community Alliance for the Ethical Treatment of Youth
Community Options (1989)
Council of Parent Attorneys and Advocates

D
Disability Rights Commission
Disability Rights Education & Defense Fund (1979)
Disability Rights UK
Disabled American Veterans
Disabled Children's Computer Group
Disabled in Action (1970) 
Disabled Peoples' International
DisAbled Women's Network Canada

E-H
Easter Seals (1916) – an international organization that provides services, education, outreach, and advocacy so that people living with autism and other disabilities can live, learn, work, and play in their communities.
Enabling Unit – It ensures affirmative action's concerning persons with disabilities at University College of Medical Sciences, Delhi and is a first such unit for students with disabilities in any medical institution in India.
Endeavour
Equal Employment Opportunity Commission
FAIDD (The Finnish Association on Intellectual and Developmental Disabilities)
Foundation for Active Rehabilitation
Galloway's Society for the Blind

I-K
IDIRIYA – not-for-profit Sri Lankan NGO promoting "Accessibility at Public Buildings and Facilities" and focusing on "Accessible Tourism for All".
Infinite Ability – a special interest group within the Medical Humanities Group of University College of Medical Sciences, Delhi, India.
International Blind Sports Federation
International Disability and Development Consortium (IDDC)
International Ventilator Users Network
Kupenda for the Children

L
L'Arche
Latvian Association for Support of Disabled People
Little People of America – the national organization for people with skeletal dysplasias that result in short stature.

M
March of Dimes Canada
Mind (The National Association for Mental Health, UK)
MindFreedom International (1990)
Movement for the Intellectually Disabled of Singapore (MINDS)
Muscular Dystrophy Association

N-O
National Alliance on Mental Illness
National Association of the Deaf (1880) – an American organization that primarily serves the Deaf population and focuses on advocacy and services.
National Autistic Society
National Disabled Women's Educational Equity Project
National Down Syndrome Congress (1973) – a national (American) not-for-profit organization that provides individuals, families, and health care providers information and support about Down syndrome.
National Federation of the Blind
National Spinal Cord Injury Association
Not Dead Yet

P-Q
People with Disability Australia
Post-Polio Health International

R
Rehabilitation International
RespectAbility
RNIB (The Royal National Institute of Blind People)
RNID (The Royal National Institute for Deaf People)

S
Scope
Slovenian Disability Rights Association
Society for Disability Studies
Spastic Society of Gurgaon (2007) – Indian Organization providing care to persons with cerebral palsy, intellectual disability, autism, multiple disabilities
Special Hockey International
Special Olympics
Survivor Corps

T 
TASH
Tourette Association of America – A national organization dedicated to the support of people living with Tourette Syndrome

U-Z 
United Cerebral Palsy
United Spinal Association, formerly the Eastern Paralyzed Veterans Association
Women with Disabilities Feminist Collective, Australian social support organization in the 1980s
YAI, The National Institute For People With Disabilities Network (previously known as Young Adult Institute)

See also
 Disability
 Disability rights movement
 Independent living
 List of disability rights activists

References

 
Disability-related lists